The cervix in insects is a membrane that separates the head from the thorax and is composed of structures from both of these. A pair of lateral cervical sclerites are embedded in the cervix.

Footnotes

References
 Scoble, M. J. (1995) The Lepidoptera: form, function and diversity. The Oxford University Press, Oxford UK. .

Insect anatomy